Grand Mosque of Sabilal Muhtadin is the largest mosque in Banjarmasin, South Kalimantan, Indonesia, in terms of capacity to accommodate people. The name chosen for this Banjarmasin Sultan Mosque is a tribute and appreciation to the late Grand Scholars, Sheikh Muhammad al-Banjary Arsyad (1710 – 1812 AD), who had developed Islam in the kingdom of Banjar or South Kalimantan region now.

Buildings and structures in South Kalimantan
Mosques in Indonesia
Mosques completed in the 1980s